is a private university in Shinjuku, Tokyo, Japan. The predecessor of the school was founded in 1948, and it was chartered as a junior college two years later. It became a four-year college in 2004. The school closed in 2014.

External links
  

Educational institutions established in 1948
Universities and colleges in Tokyo
1948 establishments in Japan
Defunct private universities and colleges in Japan